Cecropterus toxeus, also known as the coyote cloudywing or coyote skipper, is a species of butterfly in the family Hesperiidae. It is found from Panama, north through Central America and Mexico to central Texas. Strays can be found up to southern Arizona.

The wingspan is 42–50 mm. Adults are on wing from February to November. There are three generations per year.

The caterpillars feed on young leaves of Ebenopsis ebano. Adults feed on flower nectar.

References

External links 
 Butterflies and Moths of North America

Hesperiidae
Butterflies of North America
Butterflies described in 1882
Butterflies of Central America